Earl of Abingdon is a title in the Peerage of England. It was created on 30 November 1682 for James Bertie, 5th Baron Norreys of Rycote. He was the eldest son of Montagu Bertie, 2nd Earl of Lindsey by his second marriage to Bridget, 4th Baroness Norreys de Rycote, and the younger half-brother of Robert Bertie, 3rd Earl of Lindsey (see the Earl of Lindsey and the Baron Willoughby de Eresby for earlier history of the Bertie family). His mother's family descended from Sir Henry Norris, who represented Berkshire and Oxfordshire in the House of Commons and served as Ambassador to France. In 1572 he was summoned by writ to Parliament as Lord Norreys de Rycote. He was succeeded by his grandson, the second Baron. In 1621, he created Viscount Thame and Earl of Berkshire in the Peerage of England. He had no sons and on his death in 1624 the viscountcy and earldom became extinct. He was succeeded in the barony by his daughter Elizabeth, the third holder of the title. On her death, the title passed to her daughter, the aforementioned Bridget, the fourth Baroness, and second wife of the second Earl of Lindsey.

Her son, the aforementioned fifth Baron, was summoned to the House of Lords as Lord Norreys of Rycote (with the precedence of 1572) on 13 April 1675. He was later Lord Lieutenant of Oxfordshire and in 1682 he was honoured when he was made Earl of Abingdon. He was succeeded by his son, the second Earl. He sat as Member of Parliament for Berkshire and Oxfordshire and served as Lord Lieutenant of Berkshire and Oxfordshire. In 1687, Lord Abingdon assumed by Royal licence the additional surname of Venables, which was that of his father-in-law. He died without surviving male issue and was succeeded by his nephew, the third Earl. He was the son of the Hon. James Bertie, second son of the first Earl. His grandson, the fifth Earl, was Lord Lieutenant of Berkshire. His son, the sixth Earl, represented Oxford and Abingdon in the House of Commons and served as Lord Lieutenant of Berkshire. His great-grandson, the eighth Earl (the son of Montagu Charles Francis Towneley-Bertie, Lord Norreys, who had assumed by Royal licence his maternal grandfather's surname of Towneley in 1896), succeeded his distant relative (his fifth cousin thrice removed) the twelfth Earl of Lindsey in the earldom of Lindsey in 1938. However, it was not until 1951 that he was recognised as Earl of Lindsey.

Another member of the Bertie family was the Hon. Francis Bertie, the second son of the sixth Earl of Abingdon. He served as British Ambassador to Italy and France and was created Viscount Bertie of Thame in 1918.

Barons Norreys of Rycote (1572)
Henry Norris, 1st Baron Norreys of Rycote (c. 1530–1601)
Francis Norris, 1st Earl of Berkshire, 2nd Baron Norreys of Rycote (1582–1624)
Elizabeth Wray, 3rd Baroness Norreys of Rycote (d. 1645)
Bridget (née Wray) Bertie, 4th Baroness Norreys of Rycote (1627–1657)
James Bertie, 5th Baron Norreys of Rycote (1653–1699) (created Earl of Abingdon in 1682)

Earls of Abingdon (1682)
James Bertie, 1st Earl of Abingdon (1653–1699)
Montagu Venables-Bertie, 2nd Earl of Abingdon (1673–1743)
Willoughby Bertie, 3rd Earl of Abingdon (1692–1760)
Willoughby Bertie, 4th Earl of Abingdon (1740–1799)
Montagu Bertie, 5th Earl of Abingdon (1784–1854)
Montagu Bertie, 6th Earl of Abingdon (1808–1884)
Montagu Arthur Bertie, 7th Earl of Abingdon (1836–1928)
Montagu Henry Edmund Towneley-Bertie, 8th Earl of Abingdon (1887–1963) (succeeded as 13th Earl of Lindsey in 1938)
Richard Henry Rupert Bertie, 14th Earl of Lindsey, 9th Earl of Abingdon (b. 1931)

The heir apparent is the present holder's son Henry Mark Willoughby Bertie, Lord Norreys (b. 1958).
The heir apparent's heir apparent is his son Hon. Willoughby Henry Constantine St Maur Bertie (b. 1996).

The Abingdon Arms in central Oxford was named after the Earl of Abingdon, who owned the site.

Arms

See also
Earl of Lindsey
Baron Willoughby de Eresby
Viscount Bertie of Thame
Andrew Bertie

Notes

References

Kidd, Charles, Williamson, David (editors). Debrett's Peerage and Baronetage (1990 edition). New York: St Martin's Press, 1990, 

Earldoms in the Peerage of England
Abingdon
Noble titles created in 1682